Limp is an unincorporated community in Saluda County, in the U.S. state of South Carolina.

History
A post office called Limp was established in 1902, and remained in operation until being discontinued in 1914.

References

Unincorporated communities in Saluda County, South Carolina
Unincorporated communities in South Carolina